Hurl or HURL may refer to:

 Hawaii Undersea Research Laboratory, in the US National Undersea Research Program
 Hurl Park, Gauteng, a suburb of Johannesburg, South Africa
 H.U.R.L., a 1995 children's video game
 Hurl!, an American game show on the G4 television channel
 Hurl or Hurley (stick), a wooden stick used in the Irish sport of hurling
 A slang term for vomiting
 Hurl Beechum (born 1973), German basketball player
 Samuel Hurl (born 1990), Canadian football player

See also 
 Hurley (disambiguation)
 Hurling, an Irish sport